Serge Parsani (born 28 August 1952 in Gorcy, France) is an Italian former professional road bicycle racer, who won one stage in the 1979 Tour de France. Currently, he is the general manager of UCI ProTeam .

1979 Tour de France
In the 1979 Tour de France, Parsani was in a breakaway together with Gerrie Knetemann in the 20th stage. At the end of the stage, Knetemann outsprinted Parsani, and Parsani was the second cyclist to cross the finishline. However, Knetemann received a 10-second penalty for being pulled by a car, and so Parsani became the winner of the stage.

Major results

1972
 1st 
 10th Overall Giro Ciclistico d'Italia
1973
 1st Trofeo Banca Popolare di Vicenza
 1st 
 1st 
 1st Stage 5 Settimana Ciclistica Bergamasca
 8th Overall Giro Ciclistico d'Italia
1975
 1st Giro delle Marche
 3rd Tre Valli Varesine
1977
 3rd Trofeo Baracchi (with Osvaldo Bettoni)
 7th Coppa Agostoni
1978
 3rd Grand Prix de Saint-Raphaël
1979
 1st Stage 20 Tour de France
 3rd Trofeo Matteotti
1980
 1st Sassari–Cagliari
 1st Stage 1a (TTT) Paris–Nice
 2nd Tour du Nord-Ouest
 6th Overall Giro del Trentino
 8th Tre Valli Varesine
1981
 1st Stage 9 Giro d'Italia
1982
 8th Gran Premio Città di Camaiore
 9th Coppa Placci
1983
 1st Stage 3 (TTT) Giro d'Italia

References

External links 

Official Tour de France results for Serge Parsani

1952 births
Living people
Sportspeople from Meurthe-et-Moselle
Italian male cyclists
Italian Tour de France stage winners
Italian Giro d'Italia stage winners
People of Lombard descent
Cyclists from Grand Est